Ferncliff Cemetery and Mausoleum is located at 280 Secor Road in the hamlet of Hartsdale, town of Greenburgh, Westchester County, New York, United States, about  north of Midtown Manhattan. It was founded in 1902, and is non-sectarian. Ferncliff has three community mausoleums including columbariums, a crematory, a small chapel, and a main office located in the rear of the main building.

Mausoleums

Ferncliff Cemetery has three community mausoleums that offer what The New York Times has described as "lavish burial spaces". This cemetery includes columbariums. As of 2001, a standard crypt space in the mausoleums was priced at $15,000. The highest-priced spaces were private burial rooms with bronze gates, crystal chandeliers, and stained-glass windows, priced at $280,000.

Ferncliff
The Ferncliff Mausoleum, aka "The Cathedral of Memories", is the cemetery's oldest mausoleum, constructed in 1928. It has classic architecture, but the corridors are dark without glass panes to admit natural light. Ed Sullivan and Joan Crawford are two of the most famous interments in the main mausoleum.

Shrine of Memories
The Shrine of Memories is Ferncliff's second mausoleum and was constructed in 1956. "Shrine of Memories" is a more contemporary structure than "Ferncliff Mausoleum". It has many panes of glass to admit natural light, and there is a painting of Christopher Columbus in the main hall of the building. Basil Rathbone is one of the most famous interments in "Shrine of Memories".

Rosewood
Rosewood is Ferncliff's most recently completed community mausoleum, having been constructed in 1999. Joseph J. Mangan was the architect of Rosewood. Singer Aaliyah and her father Michael Haughton have a private room in Rosewood. Cab Calloway is interred with his wife Zulme "Nuffie".

Ground burials
The cemetery is also known for its in-ground burials in sections located in front of the mausoleums. Ferncliff is one of the very few cemeteries that does not permit upright headstones in its outdoor plots. All outdoor grave markers are flush with the ground. This feature facilitates maintenance of the cemetery grounds. However, there are several upright headstones that were placed before this policy was instituted. Malcolm X and the most famous ground burials, in plot Pinewood B.

Notable burials
 Aaliyah (1979–2001), singer, actress, model, dancer; her father Michael Haughton (1951–2012), lies above her
 Arthur W. Aleshire (1900–1940), congressman
 Paul Althouse (1889–1954), opera singer
 Harold Arlen (1905–1986), composer
 Tommy Armour (1895–1968), Hall of Fame professional golfer
 Leopold Auer (1845–1930), violinist
 Arleen Auger (1939–1993), opera singer
 Albert E. Austin (1877–1953), U.S. Congressman from Connecticut
 Arthur Baer (1886–1969), journalist
 James Baldwin (1924–1987), novelist, essayist
 Richard Barthelmess (1895–1963), actor
 Béla Bartók (1881–1945), composer, pianist, scholar;
 Charles A. Beard (1874–1948), educator, historian
 Mary Ritter Beard (1867–1958), historian
 Ouida Bergère (1886–1974), actress and screenwriter
 Joseph P. Bickerton Jr. (1878–1936), attorney, theatrical producer
 Sherman Billingsley (1900–1966), restaurateur, owner of Stork Club
 Ray Bloch (1902–1982), composer, songwriter and arranger
 Clint Blume (1898–1973), baseball player
 Ballington Booth (1857–1940), social reformer (Volunteers of America)
 Maud Booth (1865–1948), co-founder of Volunteers of America
 Irène Bordoni (1895–1953), actress, singer
 Connee Boswell (1907–1976), singer
 Peaches Browning (1910–1956), actress
 John Brownlee (1900–1969), Australian baritone
 Adolph Caesar (1933–1986), actor
 Cab Calloway (1907–1994), musician
 Northern Calloway (1948–1990), actor
 Anthony Campagna (1884–1969), real estate developer
 Salvatore Cardillo (1880–1947), composer
 Hattie Carnegie (1880–1956), fashion designer
 Thomas Carvel (1906–1990), founder of Carvel Ice Cream
 Boris Chaliapin (1904–1979), artist, portrait painter, the son of Russian opera singer Feodor Chaliapin, brother of actor Feodor Chaliapin Jr.
 Mady Christians (1900–1951), actress
 Michael "Trigger Mike" Coppola (1900–1966), Mafioso
 Alexander Cores (1900–1994), violinist, Dorian String Quartet
 Joan Crawford (c. 1905–1977), actress
 Ossie Davis (1917–2005), actor
 Lya De Putti (1899–1931), actress
 Ruby Dee (1922–2014) actress
 Jack Donahue (1888–1930), actor and dancer
 O. L. Duke (1953–2004), actor
 Charles Evans (1926–2007), business leader, older brother of Robert
 Robert Evans (1930–2019), film producer
 Mit'hat Frashëri (1880–1949), Albanian diplomat, writer, politician
 Lew Fields (1867–1941), actor and comedian
 John Flanagan (1865–1952), American sculptor
 Michel Fokine (1880–1942), choreographer
 Donald Foster (1889–1969), actor
 Nahan Franko (1861–1930), musician
 Anis Fuleihan (1900–1970), musician
 Betty Furness (1916–1994), actress, consumer advocate, and commentator
 Jane Gail (1890–1962), actress
 Maria Gay (1879–1943), Catalan opera singer
 Lawrence Otis Graham (1961–2021), lawyer and author
 Minnie Gentry (1915–1993), actress
 Johnny Gunther (1929–1947), son of John Gunther and subject of Death Be Not Proud
 Oscar Hammerstein II (1895–1960), librettist
 Annette Hanshaw (1901–1985), singer
 Renee Harris (1876–1969), theatre producer
 Moss Hart (1904–1961), playwright and director
 Kitty Carlisle Hart (1910–2007), actress and singer
 Irene Hayes (1896–1975), businesswoman; founded Irene Hayes Wadley & Smythe and Gallagher's Steakhouse
 Robert Holland (1940–2021), business executive
 Karen Horney (1885–1952), psychiatrist
 Alberta Hunter (1895–1984), singer and songwriter
 Jam Master Jay (1965–2002), DJ for Run-DMC
 Jerome Kern (1885–1945), composer
 Juliana Young Koo (1905–2017), American-Chinese diplomat
 Wellington Koo (1888–1985), diplomat, statesman; Ambassador of Republic of China  
 Hsiang-Hsi Kung (1881–1967), Minister of Finance and Industry of Republic of China
 Avon Long (1910–1984), actor, singer, and dancer
 Marion Lorne (1883–1968), actress
 James Male (c. 1896–1947), lawyer and member of the New York State Assembly
 Moms Mabley (1899–1975), comedian
 Michael Malloy (1873–1933), murder victim
 Hugh Marlowe (1911–1982), actor
 Elsa Maxwell (1883–1963), columnist, society figure
 Jeffrey Miller (1950–1970), victim of the Kent State shootings and subject of John Filo's iconic photo of the event
 Ludwig von Mises (1881–1973), economist and philosopher
 Thelonious Monk (1917–1982), musician
 Khalid Abdul Muhammad (1948–2001), black nationalist and separatist
 Ona Munson (1910–1955), actress
 Dwight Arrington "Heavy D" Myers (1967–2011), rapper and actor
 Nat Nakasa (1937–1965), South African writer; his remains were repatriated to South Africa on August 19, 2014 for reburial at Chesterville, Durban, South Africa, in September 2014
 Dagmar Nordstrom (1903–1976), pianist, composer, one of the Nordstrom Sisters
 Frederick O'Neal (1905–1992), actor
 William Oberhardt (1882–1958), artist, portrait painter, illustrator, sculptor
 David M. Potts (1906–1976), U.S. Congressman, House of Rep. (NY)
 Leopold Prince (1880–1951), lawyer, New York State Assemblyman, judge, conductor
 Anne Eisner Putnam (1911–1967), painter
 Otto Rank (1884–1939), psychiatrist
 Vincenzo Rao (1898–1988), Lucchese crime family mobster
 Connie Rasinski (1907–1965), animator
 Basil Rathbone (1892–1967), actor
 Sharon Redd (1945–1992), singer
 Charles Revson (1906–1975), founder of Revlon Cosmetics
 Peter Revson (1939–1974), racecar driver
 Paul Robeson (1898–1976), actor, singer, and civil rights activist
 Gene Rodemich (1890–1934), pianist and bandleader
 Arsenio Rodríguez (1911–1970), Cuban composer and bandleader
 Sigmund Romberg (1887–1951), composer
 Jerry Ross (1926–1955), songwriter
 Diana Sands (1934–1973), actress
 Friedrich Schorr (1888–1953), opera singer
 Gerlando Sciascia (1934–1999), Bonanno crime family caporegime, Rizzuto clan caporegime
 Malik Sealy (1970–2000), NBA guard (Minnesota Timberwolves)
 Betty Shabazz (1936–1997), philosopher; wife of Malcolm X
 Malcolm Shabazz (1984–2013), grandson of Malcolm X
 Toots Shor (1903–1977), restaurateur
 Leo Sirota (1885–1965), pianist, teacher, and conductor
 Otto Soglow (1900–1975), author and cartoonist (The New Yorker)
 Yu Yi Chang Soo (1900–1988), first wife of Chinese poet Xu zhimo
 Soong Ai-ling (1888–1973), eldest of the three Soong sisters
 Soong Mei-ling (1897–2003), First Lady of the Republic of China
 T. V. Soong (1894–1971), financier and diplomat; chairman of National Bank of China and brother of the Soong sisters
 Alfred Steele (1901–1959), board chairman of Pepsi, married to Joan Crawford
 Preston Sturges (1898–1959), writer and director
 Ed Sullivan (1901–1974), columnist and television host
 Anya Taranda (1915–1970), model and showgirl
 Diana Trilling (1905–1996), author and literary critic
 Lionel Trilling (1905–1975), literary critic
 Judy Tyler (1932–1957), actress
 Myrtle Vail (1888–1978), actress
 David Warfield (1866–1951), actor
 Cornell Woolrich (1903–1968), author, screenwriter
 Malcolm X (El-Hajj Malik El-Shabazz; born Malcolm Little, 1925–1965), human rights leader
 Hilda Yen (1904–1970), Chinese society figure, aviator and diplomat, Baháʼí Faith
 Joe Young (1889–1939), composer
 Whitney Young (1921–1971), social reformer (National Urban League)

Cremations
Ferncliff Cemetery has the only crematory in Westchester County, New York, and performs approximately 10% of the cremations in New York state. Because of local ordinances, no additional crematories can be constructed in Westchester County.

Cremations
People whose remains were cremated and inurned at Ferncliff, but some people whose ashes were taken somewhere else include:
 Diane Arbus (1923–1971), artistic photographer noted for photographs of marginalized people considered ugly or surreal.
 Alan Freed (1921–1965), radio DJ known as "The Father of Rock & Roll". His ashes were moved to the Rock and Roll Hall of Fame in 2002.
 Jim Henson (1936–1990), Muppets creator. His ashes were scattered at his Santa Fe, New Mexico, ranch.
 John Lennon (1940–1980), singer and songwriter (The Beatles)
 Alan Jay Lerner (1918–1986), composer and playwright
 Nelson Rockefeller (1908–1979), Governor of New York and Vice President of the United States. His ashes were scattered on his estate.
 Christopher Reeve (1952–2004), actor best known for his role of the title character in Superman and its three sequels. His ashes were sprinkled in the wind by Dana and their family. His cenotaph stands outside Dana's columbarium. 
 Dana Reeve (1961–2006), Christopher Reeve's wife; actress, singer and activist involving disability causes. Her ashes were inurned in a columbarium.

 Nikola Tesla (1856–1943), scientist of electrotechnics. His ashes were placed in the Nikola Tesla Museum, Belgrade.
 Lenore Ulric (1892–1970), actress
 Raymond Walburn (1887–1969), actor
 Ed Sullivan (1901–1974), columnist and television host

See also
 List of cemeteries in the United States

References

External links
 Ferncliff Cemetery Association
 
 

1902 establishments in New York (state)
Cemeteries in Westchester County, New York
Mausoleums in the United States